This Sporting Life is a 1963 drama film. 

This Sporting Life may also refer to:

 This Sporting Life (novel), the 1960 novel on which the film is based
 This Sporting Life (radio program), an Australian radio programme
  This Sporting Life (Roy & HG album), a 2016 retrospective comedy album
 This Sporting Life (Skink and Demoralised album), a 2010 album by Skint & Demoralised
 "This Sporting Life", a 1965 Ian Whitcomb song

See also
 Sporting Life (disambiguation)